Senegal sent a delegation to compete at the 2008 Summer Paralympics in Beijing, People's Republic of China.

Athletics

Men's field

Women's track

See also
Senegal at the Paralympics
Senegal at the 2008 Summer Olympics

External links
International Paralympic Committee

Nations at the 2008 Summer Paralympics
2008
Summer Paralympics